John Newcomb Boyett (born December 20, 1989) is a former American football safety. He was a member of the Indianapolis Colts and Denver Broncos, but due to several legal incidents, did not play a game in the National Football League (NFL). He won a Grey Cup as a member of the Ottawa Redblacks of the Canadian Football League (CFL).

College football
Boyett played college football for the Oregon Ducks from 2008 to 2012. In 2011, he was voted Second-team All-Pac-10. In 2012, Boyett was named to watch lists for Bednarik Award, Bronko Nagurski Trophy and Jim Thorpe Award. His Oregon career ended one game into the 2012 season due to surgeries on both patellar tendons.

Professional career

Indianapolis Colts
Boyett was selected by the Indianapolis Colts during the sixth round in the 2013 NFL draft. He signed with the Colts on May 9, and was placed on the non-football injury list on July 23, 2013. On September 3, 2013, he was released by the Colts after being arrested the day prior for disorderly conduct, public intoxication and resisting law enforcement. Boyett tried to enter a bar and was turned away for being already intoxicated. After refusing to leave, the police were called and he reportedly threatened officers and said "You can’t arrest me, I’m a Colts player" after attempting to flee. Boyett issued an apology on September 4.

Denver Broncos
Boyett was signed to the Denver Broncos' practice squad on November 19, 2013. He was released by the Broncos on October 23, 2014, following an arrest for third degree assault, theft, and harassment. After headbutting a cab driver, Boyett reportedly stole a shovel from a nearby construction site and attempted to cover himself in mulch. After being found, he demanded the officers call John Elway before repeatedly hitting his head against a patrol car window while yelling and spitting.

Ottawa Redblacks
Boyett signed with the Ottawa Redblacks of the Canadian Football League in July 2015. In his first season in the CFL Boyett played in only 4 games, but contributed 6 defensive tackles, 2 special teams tackles and 1 interception in limited playing time. During the off-season, and into the early part of the 2016 season Boyett was transitioned into a linebacker role, resulting in the release of veteran David Hinds. In his new position Boyett saw increased play time appearing in 11 games for the Redblacks and amassing 28 defensive tackles to go along with 10 special teams tackles, 2 sacks and 1 interception as the Redblacks went on to win the Grey Cup.

References

External links
Oregon Ducks profile

1989 births
Living people
People from Woodland, California
Sportspeople from Greater Sacramento
Players of American football from California
American football safeties
Oregon Ducks football players
Indianapolis Colts players
Denver Broncos players
American players of Canadian football
Canadian football defensive backs
Ottawa Redblacks players